The dangerous bend or caution symbol ☡ was created by the Nicolas Bourbaki group of mathematicians and  appears in the margins of mathematics books written by the group.  It resembles a road sign that indicates a "dangerous bend" in the road ahead, and is used to mark passages tricky on a first reading or with an especially difficult argument.

Variations
Others have used variations of the symbol in their books. The computer scientist Donald Knuth introduced an American-style road-sign depiction in his Metafont and TeX systems, with a pair of adjacent signs indicating doubly dangerous passages.

Typography

In the LaTeX typesetting system, Knuth's dangerous bend symbol  can be produced by
first loading the font manfnt (a font with extra symbols used in Knuth's TeX manual) with

\usepackage{manfnt}

and then typing

\dbend

There are several variations given by \lhdbend, \reversedvideodbend, \textdbend, \textlhdbend, and \textreversedvideodbend.

See also
Halmos box

References

External links
Knuth's use of the dangerous bend sign. Public domain GIF files.
Latex style file to provide a "danger" environment marked by a dangerous bend sign, based on Knuth's book.

Mathematical symbols